Keighley is a town and civil parish within the metropolitan borough of the City of Bradford in West Yorkshire, England.

Keighley may also refer to:

Topics associated with Keighley, Yorkshire
 Elections
 Keighley Central, an electoral ward
 Keighley East, an electoral ward
 Keighley (UK Parliament constituency)
 1911 Keighley by-election
 1913 Keighley by-election
 1915 Keighley by-election
 1918 Keighley by-election
 1942 Keighley by-election
 Keighley West, an electoral ward

 Sport
 Keighley Cougars, a professional rugby league club
 Keighley RUFC, a rugby union club

 Transport
 Keighley and Kendal Turnpike, a former turnpike road
 Keighley & Worth Valley Railway, a heritage railway line which connects to the national rail network at Keighley railway station
 Rolling stock of the Keighley & Worth Valley Railway
 Keighley Bus Company
 Keighley bus station
 Keighley Corporation Tramways (defunct)
 Keighley railway station
 Keighley Tramways Company (defunct)

 Other uses
 Keighley and District Local History Society
 Keighley Festival, an annual event
 Keighley News, a newspaper
 Keighley Picture House, a cinema
 Keighley sex gang, the defendants in a criminal case

Other places
 Keighley, Kansas, an unincorporated community in U.S.A.

People
 Alice Keighley (born 1993), Australian team handball and beach handball player
 Brian Keighley (1948–2015), Scottish physician
 Geoff Keighley (active from 2008), Canadian video game journalist and television presenter
 Geoffrey Keighley (1925–2005), English barrister, businessman, first-class cricketer, farmer, grazier and legislator
 Henry de Keighley, English politician
 William Keighley (1889–1984), American stage actor and Hollywood film director

See also
 Bradford-Keighley Youth Parliament, a youth organisation associated with Keighley, Yorkshire